D. crispa may refer to:
 Danaea crispa, a fern species in the genus Danaea
 Dicranella crispa, a moss species in the genus Dicranella

See also
 Crispa (disambiguation)